Jeff Banks  PPCSD (born Jeffrey Tatham-Banks, 17 March 1943) is a Welsh fashion designer of men's and women's clothing, jewellery, and home furnishings. Born in Ebbw Vale, Wales, Banks co-founded the fashion chain Warehouse in the late 1970s. He later created and presented the television programme The Clothes Show, broadcast on BBC One from 1986 to 2000.

Biography
Banks was born in the Monmouthshire valleys of South Wales, at Ebbw Vale.  His sheet metal worker father left his mother when Banks was eight, and she consequently decided to move to London.

He was offered a scholarship to independent public school St Dunstan's College, in Catford, south London, but his mother couldn't afford the uniform. He went to Brockley County Grammar School instead, but still without a uniform.  In order to afford a uniform he set up his own business buying paraffin at the bottom of the hill, then pushing it up in an old pram, and selling it for a penny more at the top of the hill.
By 13 he was employing a man to drive a lorry-based tanker, and at 15 he sold the business.

Encouraged by a teacher to study art and become a painter, he realised his art skills were limited during his first year at London's Camberwell School of Art, and so transferred to studying interior design and latterly textiles at Saint Martin's School of Art, and then fashion at New York's Parsons The New School for Design.

Banks holds honorary degrees from the University of Lancaster, University of East London, Newcastle University, University College for the Creative Arts, and the University of Westminster, and is a Doctor of Arts.

He was awarded the Minerva Medal by the Chartered Society of Designers in 1994 and was the Society's President from 2001 to 2003.

In 2009 Banks was appointed as a Commander of the Most Excellent Order of the British Empire in the Queen's Birthday Honours.

Career
In 1964, with money saved from the paraffin business and from his father mortgaging his own home, Banks opened the boutique Clobber in London, which carried his own designs along with other designers' work. It proved such a success that in 1969, he launched his own fashion label.

In 1975 he opened the first standalone Jeff Banks shop in London, as well as retail outlets in twenty-two department stores, including Harrods and Harvey Nichols.

In the late 1970s, he co-launched the fashion chain Warehouse, as well as continuing to work as a freelance designer. After it was taken over by retail chain Sears, he was sacked for being disruptive in board meetings – which he never regrets. In 1979 and 1981 Banks became British Designer of the Year, and in 1980 he was made "British Coat Designer of the Year". During the mid-to late 1980s, he designed a large proportion of the stage-clothes for musician Howard Jones.

Banks's standing as a commercial force in retail fashion led to his presenting over 320 episodes of The Clothes Show, the BBC's long-running fashion show, alongside Selina Scott and Caryn Franklin. The show's success in often gaining over 10 million viewers, led in 1989 to the first "Clothes Show Live" event at the NEC Birmingham, as well as the launch of the Clothes Show magazine.

Having been asked to create corporate design wear for many organisations Jeff Banks created his own corporate clothing company in 1996. Incorporatewear is now one of the largest companies in the United Kingdom producing corporate clothing. With partners Rob Pollock and Brian Lamb the company produces a wide range of clothing for various types of companies.

In 2000, he signed a deal to design clothes for the UK chain Sainsbury's. The installation of Jeff Banks stores within Sainsbury's outlets proved successful, but a dispute led to the early termination of his contract. The resulting lawsuit was resolved with Sainsbury's agreeing to pay a reported settlement of £1 million, plus a box of truffles every week.

In April 2007, Banks mocked Kate Moss's design range for Top Shop, saying: "Can Kate sharpen a pencil, do an impression of a cow or draw a matchstick man? I would put money on it, though not very much. I'll bet [Kate Moss] just grabbed one of her many Prada bags, rifled through her wardrobe ... and turned up at Topshop's head office in Oxford Street for a quick hour's briefing with the in-house designers and buying staff."

Banks has continued to work as a designer with designs for the Guide Association, the England football team, and recently for London's 2012 Olympics bid, which were modelled at the launch by Sir Bobby Charlton, Sir Steve Redgrave and Denise Lewis. Banks continues to be heavily involved in corporate clothing and uniform. In May 2010 he offered to design the match-day 'walk-on' suits for the cash-strapped Portsmouth F.C. team for their FA Cup final appearance.

Banks's own fashion design influences are Hardy Amies, Giorgio Armani and Alice Temperley.

Personal life
Banks has been married twice: firstly to the 1960s pop star Sandie Shaw (1968–1978), (with whom he has one daughter), and subsequently to Sue Mann, a model and film makeup artist.

Banks is a lifelong member of Catford Cycling Club, and a sponsor of their racing team CatfordCC Equipe/Banks, an amateur under-23 squad having British National 'Elite' team status.

References

External links
 
 
 
 incorporatewear
 ICW tailored by Jeff Banks 
 Jeff Banks Australia
 Jeff Banks Official Online Store

1943 births
Living people
Alumni of Saint Martin's School of Art
Chartered designers
Converts to Buddhism
People educated at St Dunstan's College
Parsons School of Design alumni
People from Ebbw Vale
Welsh fashion designers
Welsh Buddhists
Commanders of the Order of the British Empire
Buddhist artists